Ahmed Arif (21 April 1927 in Diyarbakır – 2 June 1991 in Ankara) was a Turkish-Kurdish poet.

His father, Arif Hikmet, is an ethnic Turkmen from Kirkuk, and his mother Sayre is Kurdish. Ahmed Arif studied philosophy at Ankara University. Arif was arrested on political grounds in 1950 and spent time in prison until 1952. Published in various literary journals, his poems were widely read due to their original lyricism and imagery influenced by Anatolian folk cultures. He published only one collection of poetry: Hasretinden Prangalar Eskittim (Fetters Worn Out by Longing/1968) – a volume that has gone through a record number of printings.

See also
 Ahmet Arif Literature Museum Library

References

External links 
Poems & Biography 
http://ahmedarif.uzerine.com website
 Poems

Kurdish poets
1927 births
People from Diyarbakır
Ankara University alumni
1991 deaths
Turkish-language writers
20th-century poets